Isaac Selby Drape (13 May 1866 – 7 February 1916) was an Australian cricketer. He played two first-class cricket matches—one for Victoria and one for Queensland, both in 1894.

See also
 List of Victoria first-class cricketers

References

External links
 
 

1866 births
1916 deaths
Australian cricketers
Victoria cricketers
Cricketers from Melbourne
Queensland cricketers
People from North Melbourne